Aaron Louis Tordini, also known as Aaron Louis and by his pen name T. A. Louis, is an American author.  Born in Daytona Beach, Florida on June 21, 1971, he is the author of the Southern Gothic novella, Things That Hang from Trees, which takes place in St. Augustine, Florida which the author frequently visited as a child.  Tordini also wrote the screenplay for the 2005 film adaptation directed by Ido Mizrahy.

Awards
Best Film, American Independents, Things That Hang From Trees, Troia International Film Festival, (2006)
Best Film, Things That Hang From Trees, Corto Imola International Film, (2008)
Award of Excellence, Things That Hang From Trees, Accolade Competition, (2008)

References

21st-century American novelists
American male novelists
American male screenwriters
Novelists from Florida
People from Daytona Beach, Florida
Living people
1971 births
21st-century American male writers
Screenwriters from Florida
21st-century American screenwriters